Palm Grandeur is a 5-star Resort, Spa, while The Grandeur Residences, is a AED 1.2 billion (USD$ 327 million) development project being built on the crescent of the Palm Jumeirah in Dubai, United Arab Emirates.

See also
List of development projects in Dubai
Palm Jumeirah

References
Palmjumeirah.ae

Year of establishment missing
Resorts in Dubai
Palm Jumeirah